Sultanpur district is a district in the Awadh region of the Indian state of Uttar Pradesh. This district is a part of Faizabad division (officially Ayodhya division) in Uttar Pradesh. The administrative headquarters of the district is  Sultanpur city. The total area of Sultanpur district is 2672.89 Sq. km.

As of 2011, Sultanpur district has a population of 2,249,036 people.

History

At the time of the Ain-i-Akbari, the area now covered by Sultanpur district was divided between the sarkars of Awadh, Lucknow, and Jaunpur, all in the subah of Awadh, as well as the sarkar of Manikpur in the subah of Allahabad. Sultanpur itself was one of the mahals, or parganas, that made up the sarkar of Awadh; it corresponded to the later pargana of Miranpur, minus its southern portion which in Akbar's day formed part of the Kathot mahal in Manikpur. It may have also included some of the later pargana of Baraunsa, which was also called Sultanpur-Baraunsa. The mahal of Sultanpur provided a force of 7,000 infantry and 200 cavalry to the Mughal army and was assessed at a tax value of 3,832,530 dams. The rest of Baraunsa then belonged to the small mahal of Bilahri, which supplied a military force of 2,000 infantry and 50 cavalry and was assessed at 815,831 dams. Like Sultanpur, the mahal of Bilahri was held by the Bachgotis and had a brick fort at its capital. The two mahals of Kishni and Sathin (or Satanpur) were also in the sarkar of Awadh; they remained separate entities until 1750, when they were amalgamated into the pargana of Jagdishpur. The last of the mahals in the sarkar of Awadh was Thana Bhadaon, a small mahal which appears to correspond with the later pargana of Asal. There is still a village called Bhadaon in this area; it used to give its name to a tappa in pargana Sultanpur.

Two mahals in the Lucknow sarkar would later form part of Sultanpur district: Amethi and Isauli. Amethi was later transferred into the sarkar of Manikpur. In Akbar's time, Manikpur also had two mahals in the present district: Jais, which was broken up beginning sometime before 1775, and Kathot, which as mentioned above covered the southern parts of pargana Miranpur. Finally, there were two more mahals in the sarkar of Jaunpur: Chanda and Aldemau.

Sultanpur district remained split between the two subahs of Awadh and Allahabad until the late 1700s, when the latter was finally broken up. By this time, the entire district had come under the Nawabs of Awadh. Nawab Saadat Ali Khan II enacted an administrative reform that replaced the subahs and sarkars with new divisions, called nizamats and chaklas. Under this new arrangement, Sultanpur was made the seat of a large nizamat with four component chaklas: Sultanpur, Aldemau, Jagdishpur, and Pratapgarh. The last of these corresponds with the present-day Pratapgarh district.

From 1793 to 1856, 27 nizams held office in Sultanpur, although several of them held office twice or were only in office for a very short time. Among the more significant nizams were Sital Parshad (in office 1794–1800), Mir Ghulam Hussain (1812–14 and 1818–23), Raja Darshan Singh (1828–34 and 1837–38) and his son Raja Man Singh (1845–47), and Agha Ali Khan (the final nazim, in office from 1850 to 1856). The nizams themselves were fairly powerless to deal with the district's powerful landowners, whose power had become so entrenched that they could get away with merely paying the ordinary revenue demands and otherwise being left alone to do as they pleased.

After the British annexation of Awadh in 1856, Sultanpur remained the seat of a district, although the administrative boundaries in the region were redrawn — Aldemau, for example, now formed part of  Faizabad district. Under the original British arrangement, Sultanpur district comprised 12 parganas, but this was changed in 1869: three parganas were transferred into the district from Faizabad, while five parganas were transferred out of the district. The new parganas were Isauli, Baraunsa, and Aldemau; while the ones that were removed were Subeha (which was transferred into Barabanki district), Inhauna, Rokha-Jais, Simrauta, and Mohanganj (which were all transferred into Raebareli district). The resulting setup would remain in place through the 20th century, with four tehsils: Sultanpur (including the parganas of Miranpur and Baraunsa), Amethi (including Amethi and Asal), Musafirkhana (including Musafirkhana, Isauli, Jagdishpur, and Gaura Jamun), and Kadipur (including Chanda and Aldemau).

Demographics 

Sultanpur district (after bifurcation) had a population of 2,249,036. Scheduled Castes made up 481,735 (21.42%) of the population.

The 2011 Indian census used the old district boundaries, where Sultanpur district consisted of Amethi, Gauriganj, Jaisinghpur, Kadipur, Lambhua, Musafirkhana, and Sultanpur sub-districts (tehsils).  When Amethi district was created, Amethi, Gauriganj, and Musafirkhana sub-districts were moved to Amethi district. The effect of this change is shown in the table below as "new boundaries" - it does not take account of Baldirai sub-district, which did not exist at the time of the 2011 census.

Languages

Hindi is the official language of the district with Urdu as additional official language. Languages spoken by the denizens of the district include Awadhi, a dialect in the Hindi continuum spoken by over 38 million people, mainly in the Awadh region.

At the time of the 2011 Census of India, 70.03% of the population in the district spoke Hindi, 25.38% Awadhi and 4.35% Urdu as their first language.

Religion

Sultanpur has a majority-Hindu population. Muslims are more concentrated in urban areas.

Administration

After its bifurcation in 2010, the Sultanpur district has five tehsils which includes Sultanpur Sadar, Kadipur, Lambhua, Baldirai and Jaisinghpur. The Amethi, Musafirkhana, and Gauriganj tehsils form part of the Amethi district, which was formed on 1 July 2010. District has one municipality, four town areas and 14 development blocks. Besides Sultanpur city, important towns are  Dostpur,  Kadipur, Koeripur, Lambhua. Sultanpur is divided into 19 police stations for the maintenance of law and order.

The subdivisions of Sultanpur district are:
 Baldirai tehsil
 Baldirai block
 Dhanpatganj block
 Sultanpur Sadar tehsil
 Kurebhar block (part)
 Kurwar block
 Dubeypur block
 Jaisinghpur tehsil
 Jaisinghpur block
 Motigarpur block
 Bhadaiya block
 Kurebhar block (part)
 Dostpur block (part)
 Lambhua tehsil
 Lambhua block
 Pratappur Kamaicha block
 Kadipur tehsil
 Dostpur block (part)
 Kadipur block
 Akhand Nagar block
 Karaundi Kala block

Municipalitites 
The district has municipalities for one city and four towns.

1. Nagar Palika Parishad, Sultanpur (Sultanpur city)

2. Nagar Panchayat, Lambhua

3. Nagar Panchayat, Dostpur

4. Nagar Panchayat, Kadipur

5. Nagar Panchayat, Koiripur

Villages 
There are total 1727 villages in the 5 tehsils of Sultanpur district.

Education

Colleges
Kamla Nehru Institute of Technology
Government Polytechnic Kenaura Sultanpur

Notable people

Prem Adib, actor from Sultanpur city
Sripati Mishra, former Chief Minister of Uttar Pradesh
Ajmal Sultanpuri, Urdu poet native of Harakhpur village
Majrooh Sultanpuri, Urdu poet and lyricist in India's Hindi language film industry
Sanjay Singh, politician and former Rajya Sabha member
D. P. Tripathi, politician and former general secretary of the Nationalist Congress Party, from Sultanpur city

See also
 Faizabad district
 Jaunpur district
 Pratapgarh district

References

 
Districts of Uttar Pradesh
Faizabad division